Nicolás Alexis Silva (born 24 January 1990) is an Argentine professional footballer who plays as a forward for S.D. Aucas.

Career
Silva got his senior career underway by joining Sportivo Las Parejas of Torneo Argentino B in 2012, he went onto make twenty-one appearances and scored four times in his debut season prior to leaving to join Torneo Argentino A club Chaco For Ever. He scored seven times in thirty-one matches during 2013–14 before moving teams again. On 1 July 2014, Silva completed a transfer to Primera B Nacional's Boca Unidos. He made his professional footballing debut in the league on 9 August versus Argentinos Juniors. After just three appearances in the 2014 campaign, Silva made thirty-seven in his second season with Boca.

2016 saw Silva depart to sign for Argentine Primera División side Colón. He scored his first top-flight goal in his second top-flight appearance; scoring Colón's fourth goal in a victory against Quilmes on 13 February. He went onto make thirty-nine appearances for Colón in two seasons. In August 2017, Silva departed to join Sud América of the Uruguayan Primera División. He was immediately loaned to Argentine club Huracán. His first match for them was in the league with Newell's Old Boys on 11 September. Silva's loan from Sud América was later investigated by FIFA for allegedly breaking transfer rules. In 2018, Silva joined Banfield.

Career statistics
.

References

External links

1990 births
Living people
Argentine footballers
Argentine expatriate footballers
Sportspeople from Entre Ríos Province
Association football forwards
Torneo Argentino B players
Torneo Argentino A players
Primera Nacional players
Argentine Primera División players
Uruguayan Primera División players
Uruguayan Segunda División players
Ecuadorian Serie A players
Sportivo Las Parejas footballers
Chaco For Ever footballers
Boca Unidos footballers
Club Atlético Colón footballers
Sud América players
Club Atlético Huracán footballers
Club Atlético Banfield footballers
Argentinos Juniors footballers
S.D. Aucas footballers
Expatriate footballers in Uruguay
Expatriate footballers in Ecuador
Argentine expatriate sportspeople in Uruguay
Argentine expatriate sportspeople in Ecuador